A one-club man in rugby league football is a player who spends his or her entire professional career with only one club. The term is often used in the context of team sports such as football or rugby.

Former players (Pre SL and NRL Era)
Players who spent their whole career with one club (making 100 or more appearances, or playing 10 or more seasons) include:

Former Players (SL and NRL Era)

Active players
As of: 02 April 2022
Last NRL Game: ROUND 10 - Sydney Roosters vs. Canberra Raiders (16/7/20)
Last SL Game: Huddersfield Giants vs. Leeds Rhinos (2/8/20)
Last Championship Game: ROUND 11 - Dewsbury Rams vs. Halifax R.L.F.C. (22/4/18)
Last League 1 Game: ROUND 8 - Workington Town vs. North Wales Crusaders (22/4/18)
Last Challenge Cup Game: ROUND 5 - Doncaster R.L.F.C. vs. Featherstone Rovers (22/4/18)

See also
 List of one-club men in association football 
 List of Major League Baseball players who spent their entire career with one franchise
 List of National Football League players who spent their entire career with one franchise
 List of NBA players who have spent their entire career with one franchise
 List of NHL players who spent their entire career with one franchise

References

Lists of rugby league players
Rugby league